Kate Kennedy may refer to:

Kate Kennedy (educator) (1827–1890), women's rights advocate
Kate Kennedy (writer) (born 1977), British biographer and academic
Kate Kennedy (Retreat), a fictional character from the 2011 film Retreat
Kate Kennedy, a 1945 play by Gordon Bottomley
Kate Kennedy, a character played by Myrna Loy on General Electric Theater

See also
Katherine Kennedy (disambiguation)
Kathleen Kennedy (disambiguation)